The Enzo Ferrari (Type F140) is a mid-engine sports car manufactured by Italian automobile manufacturer Ferrari and named after the company's founder, Enzo Ferrari. It was developed in 2002 using Formula One technology, such as a carbon-fibre body, F1-style automated-shift manual transmission, and carbon fibre-reinforced silicon carbide (C/SiC) ceramic composite disc brakes, as well as technologies not allowed in F1, such as active aerodynamics.

The Enzo's F140 B V12 engine was the first of a new generation for Ferrari. It is based on the design of the V8 engine found in the Maserati Quattroporte, using the same basic design and 104 mm (4.1 in) bore spacing.

Production and development
The Enzo was designed by Ken Okuyama, the then Pininfarina head of design, and initially announced at the 2002 Paris Motor Show with a limited production run of 399 units. The company sent invitations to existing customers, specifically, those who had previously bought the F40 and F50. All 399 cars were sold in this way before production began. In 2004, the 400th production car was built and donated to the Vatican for charity, which was later sold at a Sotheby's auction for US$1.1 million.

Three development mules were built: M1, M2, and M3. Each mule utilised the bodywork of a 348, a model which had been succeeded by two generations of mid-engined V8 sports cars—the F355 and the 360 Modena—by the time the mules were built.  The third mule was offered for auction alongside the 400th Enzo in June 2005, selling for €195,500 (US$236,300).

Specifications

Engine

The engine in the Enzo is longitudinally mounted, and the car has a rear mid-engine, rear-wheel-drive layout with a 44%/56% front/rear weight distribution. The redline is 8,200 rpm.

Suspension, gearbox and brakes

The Enzo has an automated manual transmission (known as the F1 gearbox) using paddle-shifters to control an automatically actuated electrohydraulic clutch and shifting mechanism, with LED lights on the steering wheel telling the driver when to change gears. The gearbox has a shift time of 150 milliseconds and was built by Graziano Trasmissioni. The transmission was a first-generation "clutchless" design from the late 1990s, and there have been complaints about its abrupt shifting.

The Enzo has four-wheel independent suspension with push-rod-actuated shock absorbers, which can be adjusted from the cabin, complemented with anti-roll bars at the front and rear.

The Enzo uses  wheels and has  Brembo disc brakes. The wheels are held by a single lug nut and fitted with Bridgestone Potenza Scuderia RE050A tyres.

Performance

Evo  tested the Enzo on the famed Nordschleife Circuit and ran a 7:25.21 lap time. The Enzo in the test had a broken electronic damper. They also tested it at Bedford Autodrome West circuit, where it recorded a 1:21.3 lap time, which is 1.1 seconds slower than the Porsche Carrera GT, but faster than the Litchfield Type-25.

Accolades
In 2004, American magazine Sports Car International named the Enzo Ferrari number three on their list of Top Sports Cars of the 2000s. American magazine Motor Trend Classic named the Enzo as number four in their list of the ten "Greatest Ferraris of all time".

However, the Enzo Ferrari was described as one of the "Fifty Ugliest Cars of the Past 50 Years", as Bloomberg Businessweek cited its superfluous curves and angles as too flashy, particularly the V-shaped hood, scooped-out doors, and bulbous windshield.

Other media
Before being unveiled at the Paris Motor Show, the show car was flown from Italy to the U.S. to be filmed in Charlie's Angels: Full Throttle. It was driven on a beach by actress Demi Moore. After filming was complete, the Enzo was flown to France to be at the Motor Show.

Gallery

Related cars

Ferrari FXX

Ferrari decided to use some of the technology developed for the Enzo in a small-scale program to get more feedback from certain customers for use in future car design as well as their racing program. The core of this program is the Ferrari FXX. The gearbox is specially developed for the car as well as the tires (custom-designed for this car by Bridgestone) along with the brakes (developed by Brembo). In addition, the car is fitted with extensive data-recording and telemetry systems to allow Ferrari to record the car's behavior. This information is used by Ferrari to develop their future sports cars.

Like the Enzo, the car was sold to specially selected existing clients of Ferrari only. The initial price was €1.3 million. Unlike the Enzo, the clients did not take delivery of the car themselves. Rather, it is maintained and kept by Ferrari and available for the client's use on various circuits as arranged by Ferrari and also during private track sessions. The car is not expected to be suitable for road use.

The Ferrari FXX program was continued until 2009 with the Ferrari FXX Evoluzione.

Ferrari P4/5 by Pininfarina

Italian design studio Pininfarina had wanted to make a special one-off sports car based on the Enzo Ferrari flagship and was looking for a backer. After sending out feelers to its clients, American Ferrari collector James Glickenhaus eventually agreed to back the project by commissioning his car as a modern homage to great Ferrari sports racing cars such as the 330 P3/4, 512 S, 312 P, and 333 SP on the last unregistered U.S.-spec Enzo chassis. The car was named the Ferrari P4/5 by Pininfarina, and retains the Enzo's drivetrain and vehicle identification number. The car was unveiled at the 2006 Pebble Beach Concours d'Elegance and appeared in the September issue of Car and Driver. After its unveiling at Pebble Beach, the P4/5 returned to Europe for high-speed testing, press days, and an appearance at the Paris Auto Show in September 2006.

Upon seeing the P4/5, the president of Ferrari Luca di Montezemolo felt that the car deserved to be officially badged as a Ferrari and along with Andrea Pininfarina and James Glickenhaus agreed that its official name would be "Ferrari P 4/5 by Pininfarina". Ted West wrote an article in Car and Driver about how this came to be: "The Beast of Turin".

Maserati MC12

The Maserati MC12 is a two-seat mid-engine sports car that is a derivative of the Enzo Ferrari developed by Maserati while under the control of Ferrari. It was developed specifically to be homologated for racing in the FIA GT Championship, with a minimum requirement of 25 road versions to be produced before the car could be allowed to compete. Maserati built 50 units, all of which were presold to selected customers. A track-only variation, the MC12 Corsa was later developed, similar to the Ferrari FXX.

The Maserati MC12 has the same engine, chassis, and gearbox as the Enzo but the only externally visible component from the Enzo is the windshield. Due to this, the Maserati MC12 is sometimes nicknamed the "Second Generation Ferrari Enzo". The MC12 is slower in acceleration (0–100 km/h or 0–62 mph being achieved in 3.8 seconds), has a lower top speed of 330 km/h (205 mph) due to engine tuning and less drag coefficient (due to a sharper nose and smoother curves) than the Enzo Ferrari. However, the MC12 has lapped race tracks faster than the Enzo before, specifically on the UK motoring show Top Gear, and the Nurbürgring Nordschleife (at colder outside temperatures). However, this could be attributed to the MC12's Pirelli P-Zero Corsa tires which have more grip than the Enzo's Bridgestone Scuderia tires.

Maserati Birdcage 75th

The Maserati Birdcage 75th is a concept car created by automobile manufacturer Maserati and designed by Pininfarina, as a celebration of Pininfarina's 75th anniversary, and was introduced at the 2005 Geneva Auto Show. It is an evolution of the MC12 and draws inspiration from the Maserati Tipo Birdcages of the 1960s. There were rumors that Maserati was going to produce the car as the MC13, for which Maserati confirmed to have plans, but they were cancelled due to problems with Pininfarina giving Maserati total control over the design of the car.

Maserati MC12 Versione Corse

The Maserati MC12 Versione Corse is a variant of the MC12 intended for racetrack use. In contrast to the race version of the MC12, of which street-legal versions were produced for homologation purposes, the MC12 Versione Corse is intended for private use, albeit restricted to the track, as the Versione Corse's modifications make it illegal to drive on the road.

The Versione Corse was developed directly from the MC12 GT1, which won the 2005 FIA GT Manufacturers Cup. The car was released in mid-2006, "in response to the customer demand to own the MC12 racing car and fueled by the growth in track days, where owners can drive their cars at high speeds in the safety of a race track", as stated by Edward Butler, General Manager for Maserati in Australia and New Zealand. In similar fashion to the Ferrari FXX, although the owners are private individuals, Maserati is responsible for the storage, upkeep, and maintenance of the cars, and they are only driven on specially organized track days. Unlike the FXX, the MC12 Corsa is not intended for research and development, and is used only for entertainment. A single MC12 Versione Corse has been modified by its owner to make it street-legal the conversion was carried out by German tuning firm Edo Competition.

Only twelve MC12 Versione Corses were sold to selected customers, each of whom paid €1 million (US$1.47 million) for the privilege. Another three vehicles were produced for testing and publicity purposes. The Versione Corse shares its engine with the MC12 GT1; the power plant produces  at 8,000 rpm,  more than the road-legal MC12. The MC12 Versione Corse shares the GT1's shortened nose, which was a requirement for entry into the American Le Mans Series. The car was available in a single standard colour, named "Blue Victory", though the car's paint could be customized upon request. The MC12 Versione Corse possesses steel/carbon racing brakes, but is not fitted with an anti-lock braking system.

Ferrari Millechili

Millechili, Italian for one thousand (mille) kilograms (chili), is the code name for a prototype sports car to be manufactured by Ferrari. It was a lightweight version of the Enzo Ferrari that would borrow features from Formula One race cars, using the F430's aluminium space frame on a  wheelbase. The hybrid power train utilising a V10 engine used in the car would exceed . The car was mainly a technological concept with no intention of production.

The Millechili was developed in collaboration with the University of Modena and Reggio Emilia, faculty of Mechanical Engineering. Millechili Lab is a cross-project in which students are working on light-weight car design.

Ferrari FXX Evoluzione

The Ferrari FXX program continued until 2009. The car continued to be improved under the Evoluzione kit, which continually adjusts specifics to generate more power and quicker gear changes, along with reducing the car's aerodynamic drag. Certain changes were made to the gearbox in order to reduce the shift time to 60 milliseconds per shift, a reduction of 20 milliseconds over the original FXX. The car also underwent aerodynamic changes and improvements to the traction control system were made in order to make the car more responsive around the track.

References

External links

 HowStuffWorks: Enzo

Sports cars
Enzo
Flagship vehicles
Rear mid-engine, rear-wheel-drive vehicles
Cars introduced in 2002
Pininfarina
Enzo Ferrari